Carson Park is a historic park located in Eau Claire, Wisconsin. It is located on a  peninsula created on an oxbow lake, Half Moon Lake, which was part of the former course of the Chippewa River. The park contains baseball, football, and softball venues, as well as the Chippewa Valley Museum.

History
The land that became Carson Park was donated in 1914 to the city of Eau Claire by heirs to lumber baron William Carson, and named in his honor. The park was opened the following year. Construction of a sports complex, including a baseball stadium, football stadium and tennis courts, began in 1935 as a Works Progress Administration (WPA) project.  The first game in the football stadium was played in 1936, and the first game in the baseball stadium was played in 1937.

The baseball stadium was added to the National Register of Historic Places in 2003.

Baseball stadium

The Carson Park baseball stadium hosts the Memorial (Old Abes), North (Huskies), Regis (Ramblers) and Immanuel Lutheran (Lancers) high school teams; the Eau Claire Express of the Northwoods League; the Eau Claire Cavaliers and Eau Claire Bears amateur teams; and the Eau Claire Pizza Hut American Legion team.

The stadium was formerly the home of the Eau Claire Bears minor league baseball team, a member of the Northern League. The first game was played in the stadium on May 4, 1937, in a Northern League game between the Eau Claire Bears and the Superior Blues.

In 1954, the Bears were renamed the Braves, after their major league affiliate, the Milwaukee Braves. Among those who played for the Bears/Braves were Hank Aaron, Billy Bruton, Wes Covington, Joe Torre, Bob Uecker, Andy Pafko and others who later played in Major League Baseball.

Following the departure of the Braves in the 1960s, the Eau Claire Cavaliers amateur team began play in 1971. Under manager Harv Tomter, the team won five amateur baseball national championships.

A statue honoring Baseball Hall of Fame player Hank Aaron was erected in front of the stadium in 1994. A renovation project around 1997/98 added permanent seats behind home plate, benches in the lower areas of the grandstand, and a remodeled concourse and exterior.

Upon the arrival of the Eau Claire Express Northwoods League franchise in 2005, the stadium underwent further renovations. A fan deck was added in the right field corner, a children's area was added along the third-base foul line near the left field corner, and an electronic message board was added to the scoreboard.  The field was re-leveled and re-sodded prior to the 2007 season.  The press box was expanded with new sections along the first- and third-base sides for the 2009 season.  An auxiliary scoreboard was built on the grandstand roof next to the press box on the third-base side for the 2010 season.

The left field wall is adjacent to the sideline of the Carson Park football stadium field.  During the football season, temporary bleachers from the baseball stadium are positioned on left field with the front of the bleachers placed along the left field wall facing the football field.

Football stadium

Carson Park's football stadium is home of the University of Wisconsin–Eau Claire Blugolds, as well as the Memorial, North and Regis football teams. It also hosted the now-defunct Chippewa Valley Predators and Eau Claire Crush of the amateur Northern Elite Football League.

The UW–Eau Claire Blugold football team began play in the stadium in 1937. A tornado that moved through Eau Claire on September 12, 1982 destroyed the press box at the football stadium.  A larger, multi-level press box was constructed in the same location.  A renovation to the football stadium's grandstand and separate concession/bathroom facilities took place in the late 1990s.

As more teams used the football field, the condition of the field deteriorated. Beginning in the 1990s, the city attempted several alternative natural grass fields. A solution came in 2004 with the installation of a FieldTurf artificial surface. New turf was again installed in 2015.

Additional venues
The park has two museums. The Paul Bunyan Logging Camp Museum, which opened in 1934, portrays the town's lumbering history and contains seven authentic logging camp buildings. The Chippewa Valley Museum, opened in 1974, serves as a regional history museum. It contains an old-fashioned ice cream parlor; the one-room Sunnyview School, dating to 1882; and the Anderson Log House, a Norwegian log house built in about 1866, which are situated next to the museum in Carson Park.

The park also has nature trails and offers other recreational activities. Half Moon Lake is the original home of the Eau Claire Ski Sprites, a water skiing show team, and the Eau Claire Horseshoe Club.

Carson Park displayed the historic locomotive Soo Line 2719 from 1960 to 1996. From Memorial Day through Labor Day, the Chippewa Valley Railroad Association operates the one-half mile,  gauge Chippewa Valley Railroad, a ridable miniature railway excursion in the park.

Images

References

External links

Ballpark Digest's Carson Park page
Eau Claire Express page on Carson Park
Wisconsin National Register of Historic Places' Carson Park page
Paul Bunyan Logging Camp website
Chippewa Valley Museum website
Chippewa Valley Railroad Association website

American football venues in Wisconsin
College football venues
Sports in Eau Claire, Wisconsin
Parks in Wisconsin
Minor league baseball venues
Parks on the National Register of Historic Places in Wisconsin
Works Progress Administration in Wisconsin
Protected areas of Eau Claire County, Wisconsin
Tourist attractions in Eau Claire County, Wisconsin
Buildings and structures in Eau Claire, Wisconsin
National Register of Historic Places in Eau Claire County, Wisconsin
High school football venues in the United States
1915 establishments in Wisconsin
Sports venues completed in 1936